Andrew Dimattina (born 9 November 1977) is a former Australian rules footballer who played primarily as a midfielder for Collingwood Football Club in the Australian Football League (AFL). Dimattina was 22 years old when he made his senior debut for Collingwood and played mainly as a run-with player. He is the brother of Paul Dimattina who played for Western Bulldogs and is the son of Frank Dimattina who played for Richmond and North Melbourne.

References

External links

Living people
1977 births
Collingwood Football Club players
Australian rules footballers from Victoria (Australia)
Oakleigh Chargers players
Box Hill Football Club players